Noel Hall may refer to:

 Noel Hall (sport shooter) (1913–2010), Australian soldier and Olympic shooting competitor
 Noel Hall (bishop) (1891–1962), Anglican Bishop in India, 1936–1957
 Noel Frederick Hall (1902–1983), economist and academic